Behind the Scenes was a 10-part television miniseries aimed towards 8- to 12-year-olds about various aspects of the arts, that was broadcast on PBS in 1992. The series was executive produced by Alice Stewart Trillin and Jane Garmey, produced and directed by Ellen Hovde and Muffie Meyer, and hosted by Penn & Teller. It was developed to illuminate the creative process underlying the working of artists.

Style
The show used a wide variety of short films, computer animation, and music to illustrate certain abstractions associated with the artistic process. Each of Penn & Teller's skits were specifically geared towards demonstrating an aspect of that episode's theme.

"'To show rhythmic patterns in a song, we produce a mouse each time the pattern goes one way and when there is a variation, we produce a frog,' Teller said. 'This continues until there are quite a number of mice and frogs all over the place.'"

"Penn and Teller said they didn't want to talk down to the series' young viewers. 'Kids tend to be desperately curious,' Teller said. 'There is a certain element we are doing in this that is making the analogy between the arts and a magic trick. When you think of something like perspective in a painting, it really is a magic trick.'"

Episodes

References

External links

1992 American television series debuts
1990s American children's television series
1990s American television miniseries
American children's education television series
PBS Kids shows
PBS original programming
Television series about art
Arts in the United States
Visual arts education